Rafael Méndez (March 26, 1906 – September 15, 1981) was a Mexican virtuoso solo trumpeter. He is known as the "Heifetz of the Trumpet."

Early life
Méndez was born in Jiquilpan, Michoacán, Mexico to a musical family. As a child, he performed as a cornetist for guerrilla leader Pancho Villa, becoming a favorite musician of his and required to remain with Villa's camp.

Career

Before music
Méndez emigrated to the US, first settling in Gary, Indiana, at age 20 and worked in steel mills. He moved to Flint, Michigan and worked at a Buick automotive plant as he established his musical career.

In music
From 1950 to 1975, Méndez was a full-time soloist. At his peak he performed about 125 concerts per year. He was also very active as a recording artist. By 1940, he was in Hollywood, leading the brass section of M-G-M's studio orchestra.  He contributed to the films Flying Down to Rio and Hondo, among others.

Méndez was legendary for his tone, range, technique and unparalleled double tonguing. His playing was characterized by a brilliant tone, wide vibrato and clean, rapid articulation. His repertoire was a mixture of classical, popular, jazz, and Mexican folk music. He contributed many arrangements and original compositions to the trumpet repertoire. His Scherzo in D minor is often heard in recitals, and has been recorded by David Hickman.

He is regarded as the popularizer of "La Virgen de la Macarena", commonly known as "the bullfighter's song", to US audiences. Perhaps his most significant if not famous single recording, "Moto Perpetuo", was written in the nineteenth century by Niccolò Paganini for violin and features Mendez double-tonguing continuously for over 4 minutes while circular breathing to give the illusion that he is not taking a natural breath while playing.

Personal life

Rafael Méndez married Amor Rodriguez after meeting her in Detroit. They had twin sons, both now surgeons; Dr. Rafael G. Méndez, Jr. and Dr. Robert Méndez, and five grandchildren.

Méndez suffered from serious asthma-related problems by the late 1950s which caused increasing difficulty performing at his level of performance. After an injury at a baseball game in Mexico in 1967 caused additional deterioration, he retired from performing in 1975, but continued to compose and arrange.

He died at his home in Encino, California on September 15, 1981.

Honors, awards and legacy
Arizona State University's music building houses the  Rafael Méndez Library which was dedicated and opened on June 11, 1993. The library holds 300 manuscripts and almost 700 compositions and arrangements by Méndez, as well as hundreds of images, articles and recordings. It also has an online counterpart.

In 2006, the Los Angeles Opera paid tribute to Rafael Mendez by performing a work based on his life. A reviewer in The Los Angeles Times believed that Mendez "has been called the greatest trumpet player of all time."

Discography
Concerto for Méndez
Love and Inspiration
Magnificent Méndez
Méndez in Madrid
Méndez Plays Arban'Rafael Méndez & Laurindo Almeida TogetherRafael Méndez (unplayed 4 disc set)Rafael Méndez and His Orchestra'
The Magic Trumpet of Rafael Méndez
The Majestic Sound of Rafael Méndez
The Singing Trumpet
The Trumpet Virtuosity of Rafael Méndez
Trumpet Extraordinary (1957)
Trumpet Showcase
Trumpet Solos Extraordinary
Trumpet Spectacular

References

External links
Rafael Méndez Online Library at Arizona State University with free mp3 sound clips

 Rafael Méndez recordings at the Discography of American Historical Recordings.

1906 births
1981 deaths
Mexican artists
Mexican composers
Mexican male composers
Mexican music arrangers
People from Jiquilpan, Michoacán
Musicians from Michoacán
Mexican trumpeters
Burials at Forest Lawn Memorial Park (Hollywood Hills)
20th-century composers
20th-century trumpeters
20th-century male musicians
Decca Records artists